Lassic (died 1863) also called, Las-sic, Las-Sic, Lasseck and Lassux in various military reports and newspaper articles at the time, was a Wailaki leader during the Bald Hills War.

Wailaki Leader in the Bald Hills War 
During the 1859-1862 period of the Bald Hills War, the Wailaki, especially Lassic's band, succeeded in driving many of the settlers out of their territory in southeastern and southwestern Humboldt County. This was despite the efforts of the local settler militia opposing them. Finally Federal troops began operating against them with the help of the locals. First Lieutenant, Joseph B Collins, of the Fourth Infantry reported his clash in 1861 with Lassic's band in the Kettenshaw Valley:

California Volunteers replaced the Federal troops after the beginning of the American Civil War and continued aggressive patrolling. Finally Lassic and his band were driven to surrender on July 31, 1862, to Captain Ketcham at Fort Baker, with thirty-two other
Indians. Twelve more of his warriors came in on August 10. The 212 captured Indians at Fort Baker were sent to join 462 others at Fort Humboldt and held for a time in the makeshift prison created out on the Samoa Peninsula in Humboldt Bay. In September 834 Indians were then sent on the steamship SS Panama to the Smith River Indian Reservation near Crescent City.

However, in early October, Lassic and three hundred natives, mostly warriors, had escaped the Smith River Reservation, followed by the exodus of more natives from the Reservation through November.

Death of Lassic

Newspaper and Official accounts 
After Lassic's escape he moved down the Kalmath River to the mountains and returned to his homeland. There he continued to carry on a campaign of resistance against the settlers until he was eventually recaptured by local militia. On Saturday, January 3, 1863, the Weekly Humboldt Times, reported:

All Right. --- We learn from Mr. Gilkey who arrived on Tuesday, from Long Valley, that the noted Indian Lassux, was in the hands of the whites at Fort Seward.  He is probably in the spirit land before this.  He was the head of the band taken from the vicinity of Fort Baker, last summer, to Smith River Reservation.  Not liking the grub set before him there by father Hansen, he led his band back to the land of pork and beef.  He will need no "cast off garments" at the reservation he now inhabits.

Lassic with a number of his men were killed at Fort Seward.  According to the January 23, 1863 Humboldt Times account they were being escorted to the Round Valley Reservation:

but "on the way they took cold and died."  This, at least, is the way we get the word.  But knowing,them as we do, the animosity existing between these Indians and the whites inhabiting the region of the Humboldt mail route, and the numerous depredations supposed to have been committed by them, we suspect the "cold" they died with was mainly cold lead.

An official report was made about the incident by Captain, C. D. Douglas, Commander of Fort Wright:

Lucy Young's account 
Many years later a different account of the killings of the forty Wailaki prisoners including Lassic was told by a Wailaki witness and relative of Lassic, Lucy Young:

References 

Year of birth uncertain
1863 deaths
Native American people of the Indian Wars
People from California
Native American leaders
Military history of California
History of California
History of Humboldt County, California
Pacific Coast Theater of the American Civil War
Bald Hills War